Elizabeth Rose Rebecca "Lizzie" Holden (born 12 September 1997) is a Manx professional racing cyclist, who currently rides for UCI Women's Continental Team .

Major results
Source:
2014
 2nd National Junior Road race Championships
2019
 National Road Championships
2nd Under-23 Time trial
3rd Road race
 6th Overall Giro della Toscana Int. Femminile – Memorial Michela Fanini
1st  Young Rider classification
2020
 6th La Périgord Ladies
2022
 National Road Championships
3rd Time trial
4th Road race
 4th Overall Belgium Tour
 7th Overall Thüringen Ladies Tour
 9th Overall Bloeizone Fryslân Tour

References

External links
 

1997 births
Living people
Manx female cyclists
People from Douglas, Isle of Man